Sea Call Farm is a historic farm in Orleans, Massachusetts, United States.  It was listed on the National Register of Historic Places in June 2008.

The property was actively farmed by William A. and Bertha Fiske during 1931–1950, after William's retirement from railway employment.  It was one of many small market-garden farms in the Barnstable County, but now is "the only surviving agricultural ensemble in Orleans and one of the few in the Cape Cod region.  Its significance is enhanced by the extensive collection of diaries, account books, and other papers that detail life on the farm...."

It was acquired from the Fiske family by the Town of Orleans in 1987, for conservation.

See also
National Register of Historic Places listings in Barnstable County, Massachusetts

References

Historic districts in Barnstable County, Massachusetts
National Register of Historic Places in Barnstable County, Massachusetts
Orleans, Massachusetts
Historic districts on the National Register of Historic Places in Massachusetts
Farms on the National Register of Historic Places in Massachusetts